Kazipur is a village in Delhi which comes under Najafgarh district in southwest Delhi. Pin code of Kazipur is 110073. All lands are acquired by Delhi government. There is Guru Garibdas temple on main road. One private school, two government schools. And a Huge Trademark of the village, that is the Sports Complex.

Climate

Average annual rainfall in kazipur is 458.5mm (18.0 inch).[7] kazipur's climate shows extreme variation in temperature. It does not usually fall below freezing point in the winter months from November to January. In summer from April to July, the day temperature generally remains between 30 °C and 40 °C occasionally going up to 48 °C on a few days.
Lowest: 2 °C (36 °F)
Highest: 45 °C (113 °F)

See also

 Najafgarh

References

Villages in South West Delhi district